In Inuit mythology, Agloolik is a spirit that lives underneath the ice and acts as tutelary guardian for the protection of seals. It is said to provide aid to fishermen and hunters. If hunters prayed to the spirit before fishing, Agloolik will bless the hunters with prey.

Sources 

Animal gods
Hunting gods
Inuit gods